2370894 is an album by breakcore artist Aaron Funk under the moniker Vsnares. It was released in 2002.

Background
Aaron Funk served as producer on the record. It is a compilation of tracks left over from sessions of previous albums, and contains an instrumental version of "Stamina" from the Cex album Being Ridden as well as songs intended for later albums. The track "Nobody Really Understands Anybody" samples the song "Please, Please, Please Let Me Get What I Want" by The Smiths.

Track listing

References

External links
 Official release page

Venetian Snares albums
2002 compilation albums
Planet Mu compilation albums